Veterans Day (originally known as Armistice Day) is a federal holiday in the United States observed annually on November 11, for honoring military veterans of the United States Armed Forces (who were discharged under conditions other than dishonorable). It coincides with other holidays including Armistice Day and Remembrance Day which are commemorated in other countries that mark the anniversary of the end of World War I. Major hostilities of World War I were formally ended at the 11th hour of the 11th day of the 11th month of 1918 when the Armistice with Germany went into effect. At the urging of major U.S. veteran organizations, Armistice Day was renamed Veterans Day in 1954.

Veterans Day is distinct from Memorial Day, a U.S. public holiday in May. Veterans Day commemorated the service of all U.S. veterans, while Memorial Day honors those who have died while in military service. Another military holiday that also occurs in May, Armed Forces Day, honors those currently serving in the U.S. military. Additionally, Women Veterans Day is recognized by a growing number of U.S. states that specifically honor women who have served in the U.S. military.

History
On November 11, 1919, President Woodrow Wilson issued a message to his countrymen on the first Armistice Day, in which he expressed what he felt the day meant to Americans:

The United States Congress adopted a resolution on June 4, 1926, requesting that President Calvin Coolidge issue annual proclamations calling for the observance of November 11 with appropriate ceremonies. A Congressional Act (52 Stat. 351; 5 U.S. Code, Sec. 87a) approved May 13, 1938, made November 11 in each year a legal holiday: "a day to be dedicated to the cause of world peace and to be thereafter celebrated and known as 'Armistice Day'".

In 1945, World War II veteran Raymond Weeks from Birmingham, Alabama, had the idea to expand Armistice Day to celebrate all veterans, not just those who died in World War I. Weeks led a delegation to Gen. Dwight Eisenhower, who supported the idea of National Veterans Day. Weeks led the first national celebration in 1947 in Alabama and annually until his death in 1985. President Reagan honored Weeks at the White House with the Presidential Citizenship Medal in 1982 as the driving force for the national holiday. Elizabeth Dole, who prepared the briefing for President Reagan, determined Weeks as the "Father of Veterans Day".

US Representative Ed Rees from Emporia, Kansas, presented a bill establishing the holiday through Congress. President Dwight D. Eisenhower, also from Kansas, signed the bill into law on May 26, 1954. It had been eight and a half years since Weeks held his first Armistice Day celebration for all veterans.

Congress amended the bill on June 1, 1954, replacing "Armistice" with "Veterans," and it has been known as Veterans Day since.

The National Veterans Award was also created in 1954. Congressman Rees of Kansas received the first National Veterans Award in Birmingham, Alabama, for his support in offering legislation to make Veterans Day a federal holiday.

Although originally scheduled for celebration on November 11 of every year, starting in 1971 in accordance with the Uniform Monday Holiday Act, Veterans Day was moved to the fourth Monday of October (October 25, 1971; October 23, 1972; October 22, 1973; October 28, 1974; October 27, 1975; October 25, 1976, and October 24, 1977). In 1978, it was moved back to its original celebration on November 11. While the legal holiday remains on November 11, if that date happens to be on a Saturday or Sunday, then federal government employees and a number of organizations will instead take the day off on the adjacent Friday or Monday, respectively.

Observance

Because it is a federal holiday, some American workers and many students have Veterans Day off from work or school. When Veterans Day falls on a Saturday then either Saturday or the preceding Friday may be designated as the holiday, whereas if it falls on a Sunday it is typically observed on the following Monday. When it falls on the weekend many private companies offer it as a floating holiday where employees can choose some other day. A Society for Human Resource Management poll in 2010 found that 21 percent of employers planned to observe the holiday in 2011.  

Legally, two minutes of silence is recommended to be observed at 2:11pm Eastern Standard Time. 

Non-essential federal government offices are closed. No mail is delivered. All federal workers are paid for the holiday; those who are required to work on the holiday sometimes receive holiday pay for that day in addition to their wages.

Armistice Day
In his Armistice Day address to Congress, Wilson was sensitive to the psychological toll of the lean War years: "Hunger does not breed reform; it breeds madness," he remarked. As Veterans Day and the birthday of the United States Marine Corps (November 10, 1775) are only one day apart, that branch of the Armed Forces customarily observes both occasions as a 96-hour liberty period.

Election Day is a regular working day, while Veterans Day, which typically falls the following week, is a federal holiday. The National Commission on Federal Election Reform called for the holidays to be merged, so citizens can have a day off to vote. They state this as a way to honor voting by exercising democratic rights.

Spelling of Veterans Day
While the holiday is commonly printed as Veteran's Day or Veterans' Day in calendars and advertisements, the United States Department of Veterans Affairs website states that the attributive (no apostrophe) rather than the possessive case is the official spelling "because it is not a day that 'belongs' to veterans, it is a day for honoring all veterans."

See also

Notes

References

External links

 Official Website United States Department of Veterans Affairs
  (Federal holidays)
 

1919 establishments in the United States
Aftermath of World War I in the United States
Annual events in the United States
Armistice Day
Federal holidays in the United States
Holidays related to World War I
November observances
Public holidays in the United States
United States flag flying days
Recurring events established in 1919
Veterans' affairs in the United States
Veterans days